The Kingscourt Sandstone is a geologic formation in Ireland. It preserves fossils dating back to the Triassic period.

See also 
 List of fossiliferous stratigraphic units in Ireland

References

External links 
 

Geologic formations of Ireland
Triassic System of Europe
Triassic Ireland
Sandstone formations